Ganganagar, also called Sri Ganganagar, Vidhan Sabha seat is one of the constituencies of Rajasthan Legislative Assembly, in India. It is a segment of Ganganagar (Lok Sabha constituency).

Ganganagar Constituency covers all voters from part of Shriganganagar tehsil, which includes ILRC Ganganagar (including Ganganagar Municipal Council and excluding Chak Maharaj Ka), ILRC Burjwali and ILRC Natewala.

Election Results

2018

1951 Vidhan Sabha
 Moti Ram (INC) : 17,215 votes 
 Chet Ram (IND) : 9,880

1993 Vidhan Sabha
 Radheshyam Hardayal (INC) : 34,252 votes 
 Surender Singh (JD) : 31,345 votes
 Bhairon Singh Shekhawat (BJP) : 26,378 votes  (Sitting CM finished in third place, but he won from Bali)

2013 Vidhan Sabha
 Kamini Jindal (NUZP) : 77,860 votes  
 Radheshyam (BJP) : 40,792

References

See also 
 Member of the Legislative Assembly (India)

Sri Ganganagar district
Assembly constituencies of Rajasthan
Sri Ganganagar